Jean Thomassen (born 5 September 1949) is a Dutch artist and author whose paintings are in an 'absurd realism' style. He lives in Heiloo in the Netherlands.

'Absurd realism' is one of numerous types of art within the broad category of 'Fantastic art'. The term was first mentioned  in the Netherlands  in 1991 in the book 'The Absurd Reality of Jean Thomassen' by the Belgian author Gerard van Hulst.

Jean Thomassen's works in this field include the triptychs 'Egyptian Triptych' (1995) and  'Last Judgement Day' (2006-2011), 28 x Rembrandt (1989), and '1900 & Yesterday' (2012-2017).  A characteristic of Thomassen's paintings is the many incongruous elements such as skies full of nails and fried eggs, crooked houses with weeping roof tiles, and eyes. In this respect his work has been compared in the press to that of the Dutch painter Hieronymus Bosch (c1450-1516). On 17 November 2008 a number of his works, including Egyptian Triptych, were destroyed when the Daan Enneking collection went up in flames.

In 2010, Jean Thomassen was made a knight in the Order of Orange-Nassau for his contributions to Dutch art. In 2013 his work was awarded a Merit Award in Leipzig Germany, and in 2014 he won the First Prize Palm Award.

Career
Thomassen did not receive formal training to become an artist and initially designed sleeves for Bootleg albums for White Label and Redita Records.

In 1973 Thomassen developed a relationship with the ballerina and actress Ine Veen,. Born in 1937, Veen had trained in dance at the Nel Roos Ballet Academy in Amsterdam, and was subsequently contracted by Yvonne Georgi for the Hanover Opera Ballet. Veen became the inspiration of many of his paintings and appeared in many of them. She arranged his debut exhibition at Gallery Artim in The Hague in 1974 and this was followed by Dutch TV film.

Ine Veen also encouraged Thomassen to enter international competitions, resulting in prizes in New York 1988, Toronto 1987, 1988, 1989 and the Biennale of Gabrovo 1989. Critics were initially divided in the assessment of his work: some thought his paintings must be the product of a deranged mind, while others viewed Thomassen as a genius.

In 1991, he held a series of commemorative exhibitions to mark the 60th anniversary of the death of Russian ballerina Anna Pavlova (1881-1931). He wrote a biography of Pavlova in 1995 that received publicity in England and Russia.
Other exhibitions followed, including one in 1995 covering at the Markiezenhof Museum in Bergen op Zoom in the Netherlands which also marked the publication of Gerard van Hulst's book 'De absurde realiteit van Jean Thomassen' ('The Absurd Reality of Jean Thomassen).

In 1999, Thomassen exhibited at the Daan Enneking Collection in the West-Fries Museum in Hoorn, followed by a retrospective there in 2001. In 2003 he exhibited for the first time in France at Galerie Archetypes Art International in Hyeres, followed in 2004 by an exhibition of his paintings at the 9th Salon International in Marseille.

Books 
Thomassen has written the following books:
 Old Masters of Tomorrow (the Enneking Collection), 2000, ISBN 9068811045
 Bastards in art, 2009, ISBN 9789059115996
 Notes on the Holocaust, 2011, ISBN 9789059116962
 The Amasis Collection (Foreword), 2020, ISBN 9780956627179

References

External links 
Official website
Secondary website

1949 births
Living people
20th-century Dutch artists